Everbright Securities Company Limited is a securities brokerage by assets in China, controlled by state-owned financial conglomerate, China Everbright Group. It was founded in 1996 and is based in Shanghai.

It was the second IPO by a Chinese brokerage, following CITIC Securities in 2002.

On 2 February 2015, Everbright Securities Co Ltd announced its agreement to buy Sun Hung Kai Financial's 70% stake for HK$4.1 billion.

See also 
 Securities industry in China

References

External links
 

Companies in the CSI 100 Index
Companies listed on the Hong Kong Stock Exchange
Companies listed on the Shanghai Stock Exchange
Financial services companies established in 1996
Government-owned companies of China
Financial services companies of China
Companies based in Shanghai
H shares
Investment banks in China
China Everbright Group